Peter Augustus Jay (August 23, 1877 – October 18, 1933) was an American diplomat who served as U.S. General Consul to Egypt, U.S. Minister to El Salvador and Romania and U.S. Ambassador to Argentina.

Early life
Jay was born on August 23, 1877 in Newport, Rhode Island. He was the son of Augustus Jay (1850–1919) and Emily Astor (née Kane) Jay (1854–1932). His younger brother was DeLancey Kane Jay (1881–1941).

His paternal grandparents were Josephine (née Pearson) Jay and Peter Augustus Jay, himself the son of Peter Augustus Jay, a member of the New York State Assembly and Recorder of New York City, and grandson of John Jay, Founding Father and first United States Chief Justice. His maternal grandparents were DeLancey Kane and Louisa Dorothea (née Langdon) Kane. His maternal uncles included DeLancey Astor Kane, Commodore S. Nicholson Kane, and Rough Rider Woodbury Kane, all cousins of John Jacob Astor IV.

In 1880, Jay was painted by John Singer Sargent. Jay studied at Eton College in England and graduated from Harvard University with an A.B. in 1900.

Career
In 1902, he began a career with the U.S. Foreign Service as the third secretary of the American embassy in Paris followed by service in Constantinople as second secretary. He was later promoted to secretary and when the legation was changed to an embassy, he continued as secretary until June 1907 when he became Chargé d'Affaires in Tokyo on July 7, 1908 where he received full powers to "exchange ratifications for the protection of inventions, designs trademarks and copyrights." He served in Japan until December 21, 1909 when he was appointed by President William Howard Taft as Consul General to Egypt in Cairo. He presented his credentials on November 28, 1910 and left his post on October 8, 1913.

On May 4, 1920, Jay was appointed U.S. Minister to El Salvador by President Woodrow Wilson, serving from February 10, 1921 until April 28, 1921. After being appointed on April 18, 1921 by President Warren G. Harding, he served from June 30, 1921 to May 9, 1925 as U.S. Minister to Romania, where he assisted in negotiating that country's repayment terms of $42,000,0000 for wartime and post World War I development loans. On March 18, 1925, he was appointed U.S. Ambassador to Argentina by President Calvin Coolidge. He presented his credentials on September 24, 1925 and was present on May 16, 1926 when a bomb exploded at the door to the US embassy, an action that might have been a protest of the guilty verdicts in the Sacco and Vanzetti trials.

Later life
While serving in Buenos Aires, his elder daughter Emily died following sleeping sickness and an operation for appendicitis. Two days later, on December 30, 1926, he resigned his post and returned to Washington, D.C. In 1928, he was appointed the American member of the Permanent International Commission established under the treaty between the United States and Spain on September 15, 1914.

Personal life
On March 16, 1909, Jay was married to Susan Alexander McCook, the daughter of Civil War officer and prominent attorney John James McCook and granddaughter of Daniel McCook of the "Fighting McCooks". Together, they were the parents of Emily Kane Jay (1911–1926) and Susan Mary Alsop (1918–2004).

He was a member of the Metropolitan Club of Washington, the Knickerbocker Club, the Harvard Club of New York and the Racquet and Tennis Club of New York. They Jays also owned a home in the State of Maine.

Jay died at his home, 1815 Q Street in Washington, D.C. on October 18, 1933.

References

External links

1877 births
1933 deaths
People educated at Eton College
Harvard University alumni
Ambassadors of the United States to Egypt
Ambassadors of the United States to El Salvador
Ambassadors of the United States to Romania
Ambassadors of the United States to Argentina
United States Foreign Service personnel
Jay family
20th-century American diplomats
People from Newport, Rhode Island
People from Washington, D.C.